Kuzhalmannam-II is a village in Palakkad district in the state of Kerala, India. It forms a part of the Kuzhalmannam gram panchayat, along with Kuzhalmannam-I.

Demographics
 India census, Kuzhalmannam-II had a population of 10,073 with 4,841 males and 5,232 females.

Facilities
Map view of facilities in and around Kuzalmannam

References

Villages in Palakkad district